Rhypopteryx is a genus of moths in the subfamily Lymantriinae. The genus was erected by Per Olof Christopher Aurivillius in 1879.

Species
Some species of this genus are:
Rhypopteryx bowdeni Collenette, 1960
Rhypopteryx camengo Collenette, 1960
Rhypopteryx capnitis Collenette, 1960
Rhypopteryx celetica Collenette, 1960
Rhypopteryx diplogramma Hering, 1927
Rhypopteryx dracontea (Romieux, 1935)
Rhypopteryx dracontea (Romieux, 1935)
Rhypopteryx dysbata Collenette, 1960
Rhypopteryx fontainei Collenette, 1960
Rhypopteryx hemichrysa Collenette, 1960
Rhypopteryx hemiphanta Collenette, 1955
Rhypopteryx lugardi (C. Swinhoe, 1903)
Rhypopteryx minor (Collenette, 1938)
Rhypopteryx pachytaenia (Hering, 1926)
Rhypopteryx perfragilis Collenette, 1957
Rhypopteryx phoenicopoda Collenette, 1957
Rhypopteryx preissi (Schultze, 1934)
Rhypopteryx psoloconiama Collenette, 1960
Rhypopteryx psolozona (Collenette, 1938)
Rhypopteryx romieuxi (Collenette, 1938)
Rhypopteryx rhodalipha (Felder, 1874)
Rhypopteryx rhodea (Hampson, 1905)
Rhypopteryx rhodocloea (Collenette, 1939)
Rhypopteryx romieuxi (Collenette, 1938)
Rhypopteryx rubripunctata (Weymer, 1892)
Rhypopteryx summissa Hering, 1927
Rhypopteryx sordida Aurivillius, 1879
Rhypopteryx syntomoides Collenette, 1957
Rhypopteryx triangulifera (Hampson, 1910)
Rhypopteryx tylota Collenette, 1957
Rhypopteryx uele Collenette, 1960
Rhypopteryx xuthosticta (Collenette, 1938)

References

Lymantriinae